James Paxton may refer to:

James Paxton (actor) (born 1994), American actor
James Paxton (baseball) (born 1988), Canadian baseball player
James Paxton (golfer) (1831–?), Scottish golfer
James Paxton (surgeon) (1786–1860), British surgeon
James E. Paxton (born 1963), district attorney in Louisiana